Nicola Valente (born 6 October 1991) is an Italian footballer who plays as a midfielder or forward for Palermo.

Club career
Valente started his career with Serie D club Legnago, with whom he played five season as an amateur from 2010 to 2015. In 2015 he moved to Serie C club Pordenone, with whom he made his debut as a professional player.

On 13 August 2020 he joined Palermo. With the Sicilians, he immediately took on a leading role, being a regular in both seasons, the last of which culminating with promotion to Serie B. He subsequently agreed to extend his contract with Palermo for one more season, thus ensuring himself the opportunity to make his debut in the Italian second division at the age of 30.

Career statistics

Club

References

External links
Nicola Valente at Soccerbase

1991 births
Living people
Pordenone Calcio players
A.S. Sambenedettese players
Carrarese Calcio players
Palermo F.C. players
Serie D players
Serie C players
Serie B players
Italian footballers
Association football midfielders